Gadong may refer to:
 Gadong A, Brunei-Muara, a mukim in Brunei
 Gadong B, Brunei-Muara, a mukim in Brunei
 Gadong, Tibet, China
 Gadong Station, a closed station on the Gyeongbuk Line, South Korea
 Gadong, Brunei, a commercial area in Bandar Seri Begawan, Brunei